"Winter's King" is a science fiction short story by American writer Ursula K. Le Guin, originally published in the September 1969 issue of Orbit, a fiction anthology.  The story is part of the Hainish Cycle and explores topics such as the human effect of space travel at nearly the speed of light, as well as religious and political topics such as feudalism.

"Winter's King" was one of four nominees for the 1970 Hugo Award for Best Short Story.

Le Guin revised the story, focusing on pronoun gender, for its inclusion in her 1975 short story collection The Wind's Twelve Quarters.

Conception
The story takes place on Gethen, the same planet shown in more detail in The Left Hand of Darkness.  It was in fact Le Guin's first vision of that place:

The original story centred on the idea that someone could age 12 years while the rest of their world had aged sixty.  (Itself one of many to address the point made by Albert Einstein: that if he could travel far enough and fast enough he could return and be younger than his own son.)  A similar idea was used by Le Guin's in the earlier short story Semley's Necklace, later expanded as Rocannon's World.  But that was a Rip Van Winkle-type fairy tale, where a person goes underground in the company of dwarves or elves, spending an apparently brief time but on emerging finding whole generations had elapsed.  Here, the Gethenians understand the science of what has happened.  The focus is psychological, someone confronting their own child who is now much older than they are.

It also includes the idea of mind manipulation, used earlier and rather differently in City of Illusions.

Plot
"Winter's King" tells the story of Argaven, ruler of a large kingdom on Gethen, a planet whose inhabitants do not have a fixed sex.  She has been kidnapped and her mind apparently altered.  Fearing this, she abdicates in favour of her infant child, with a reliable regent to rule until the child Emran is old enough.  With the help of aliens from distant worlds (who include Earth-humans) she travels to another planet 24 light-years away, using a Nearly-As-Fast-As-Light ship.  This means 24 years pass but she is no older.  News passes by means of an instantaneous communicator (ansible) and all seems well.

On this planet (Ollul) she is cured of the mind alterations, which would have made her a paranoid tyrant had she tried to carry on.  There she lives and studies for 12 years, learning about the wider society of many planets and about people with two fixed sexes, very alien to her.

She then learns that things are going badly back home and is persuaded to go home, which takes another 24 years.  Sixty years have now passed: her child is now old and has become a tyrant.  Public opinion is with her and she is restored, with Emran committing suicide.

The story ends there.  But the 1995 short story "Coming of Age in Karhide" (which appears in a collection called The Birthday of the World) mentions in passing the first and second reigns of Argaven, saying little but indicating that the second reign was a success.

Literary significance and criticism
Charlotte Spivack points out that the story's winter theme precedes and produces the story's androgyny theme.

Susan Wood deems the story notable because of its scientific extrapolation of topics such as sub-lightspeed travel and alien biology, topics which "provide a framework for powerful psychological studies."

References

Sources

 
 
 
 

1969 short stories
Science fiction short stories
Short stories by Ursula K. Le Guin
Hainish Cycle